Ed, Edward, Eddie, or Edwin Gallagher may refer to:
 Ed Gallagher (American football, born 1903) (1903–1963), also known as Edward B. Gallagher, American football player for the (NFL) New York Yankees
 Ed Gallagher (American football, born 1957) (1957–2005), also known as Edwin B. Gallagher, American college football player for Pitt and LGBT advocate
 Ed Gallagher (baseball) (1910–1981), Major League Baseball player for the Boston Red Sox in the 1932 season
 Ed Gallagher (scientist) (born 1944), British scientist
 Eddie Gallagher (footballer) (born 1964), Scottish footballer who played for Partick Thistle F.C. among other teams
 Eddie Gallagher (Navy SEAL) (born 1979), US Navy SEAL
 Ed Gallagher (actor) (1873–1929), American vaudeville actor
 Edward Gallagher (politician) (1829–1895), New York state legislator
 Edward C. Gallagher (1887–1940), American wrestling coach at Oklahoma State University